Parecis or Parecís may refer to:

Parecis, Rondônia, a municipality in Brazil
Parecis Plateau, a plateau in Brazil
Parecis River, a river in Mato Grosso, Brazil
Parecís language or Paresi, an Arawakan language of Brazil

See also 
 Pareci (disambiguation)
 Paresis, a medical condition